Thirunanthikarai is a village situated in Thirparappu panchayat, in the Kanyakumari district of Tamil Nadu, India. This village comes under the post office of Kulasekharam, 3 km away, and is located along the Kulasekharam–Pechiparai road.

See also

 Thirunadhikkara Cave Temple, also referred to as Thirunanthikarai rock-cut Shiva temple, is a 9th-century rock-cut Hindu cave temple in Kanyakumari district.

References

Villages in Kanyakumari district